Craig Warner (born 25 April 1964) is a multiple award-winning playwright and screenwriter who lives and works in Suffolk, England.

His play Strangers on a Train, based on the novel by Patricia Highsmith, ran in London's West End in 2013–14, and starred Jack Huston, Laurence Fox, Miranda Raison, Imogen Stubbs, Christian McKay, and MyAnna Buring. It was directed by Robert Allan Ackerman and produced by Barbara Broccoli.

He wrote The Queen's Sister for Channel 4, which was nominated for several BAFTA awards (including Best Single Drama), Maxwell for BBC2, which garnered a Broadcasting Press Guild Award nomination for Best Single Drama and won David Suchet an International Emmy for Best Actor, and The Last Days of Lehman Brothers, for which Warner was longlisted for a BAFTA Craft Award for Best Writer, and which won him the award for Best Writer at the Seoul International Drama Awards in 2010. He wrote the mini-series Julius Caesar for Warner Bros., which gained Warner a Writers Guild Award nomination for Best Original Long-Form Drama, and he performed an extensive uncredited rewrite on The Mists of Avalon, also for Warner Bros., which was nominated for a Writers Guild Award and nine Emmys, including Best Mini-series. Warner wrote the screenplay for Codebreaker, a film about Alan Turing.

Craig Warner started out writing for the theatre and for radio. His first radio play for BBC Radio 4, Great Men of Music, was performed by Philip Davis and was included in Radio 4's first Young Playwrights Festival. His second play By Where the Old Shed Used to Be, with Miranda Richardson, won the Giles Cooper Award for Best Radio Plays of the Year, and it was included in the volume of winners for 1989, published by Methuen. His play Figure With Meat also won a Giles Cooper Award and was published in the Methuen volume of 1991. Craig Warner is the award's youngest ever winner, having received it for the first time when he was 24. He is also a composer and has written music and songs for a number of his works, including a full-length musical for BBC Radio 3 about the legend of Cassandra, called Agonies Awakening.

Warner received a BA in philosophy from King's College London and an MA in creative writing from the University of East Anglia. He was born in Los Angeles.

Awards
 2012: Winner – Best Production, EuroPAWS Science TV Audience Award, Codebreaker 
 2010: Winner – Best Writer, Seoul International Drama Awards, The Last Days of Lehman Brothers 
 2008: Nominated – Broadcasting Press Guild Awards, Best Single Drama, Maxwell
 2006: Nominated – BAFTA TV Award, Best Single Drama, The Queen's Sister 
 2004: Nominated – Writers Guild of America, WGA Award (TV), Best Original Long-Form Drama, Julius Caesar
 1998: Nominated – Verity Bargate Award, Soho Theatre, Dark Leaves
 1997: Nominated – Vivian Ellis Prize, Kings Head Theatre, Agonies Awakening
 1992: Nominated – European Broadcast Union Award, High Flyer
 1991: Winner – BBC/Methuen Giles Cooper Awards, Best Radio Plays of the Year, Figure With Meat
 1989: Winner – BBC/Methuen Giles Cooper Awards, Best Radio Plays of the Year, By Where the Old Shed Used to Be

Television
 2011: Codebreaker, Channel 4 – with Henry Goodman, Ed Stoppard
 2009: The Last Days of Lehman Brothers, BBC2 – with James Cromwell, Ben Daniels, Corey Johnson, Alex Jennings, Michael Landes, Henry Goodman, Michael Brandon, James Bolam
 2006: Maxwell, BBC2 – with David Suchet, Patricia Hodge, Dan Stevens
 2004: The Queen's Sister, Channel 4 – with Lucy Cohu, Toby Stephens, David Threlfall
 2002: Julius Caesar, Warner Bros./TNT – with Christopher Walken, Richard Harris, Jeremy Sisto, Valeria Golino, Chris Noth
 2001: The Mists of Avalon (uncredited), Warner Bros./TNT – with Anjelica Huston, Joan Allen, Julianna Margulies

Theatre
 2013: Strangers on a Train, Gielgud Theatre, West End, London – with Jack Huston, Laurence Fox, Miranda Raison, Imogen Stubbs, Christian McKay, and MyAnna Buring. Directed by Robert Allan Ackerman. Produced by Barbara Broccoli.
 2004: Disguises, Alabama Shakespeare Festival
 2002: Fallen, Merrimack Theatre, Boston
 1999: Love to Madeleine, Pleasance Theatre, Edinburgh Festival
 1992: Caledonian Road, White Bear Theatre, London
 1988: God's Country, Old Red Lion, London
 1987: Matthias, Cooper Square Theatre, New York
 1986: A Place to Watch Her Grow, Cooper Square Theatre, New York

Radio
 2013: Tosca's Kiss, BBC Radio 3 – with Stephen Dillane, Kate Fleetwood
 1997: Agonies Awakening (book, music and lyrics), BBC Radio 3 – with Anton Lesser, Miles Anderson, Clare Holman, Hugh Quarshie, Josette Simon
 1996: Beaumarchais, six-part serial, BBC Radio 4 – with Henry Goodman, Ronald Pickup, Bill Nighy, David Calder, Ron Cook
 1996: Strangers on a Train, BBC Radio 4 – with Saskia Reeves, Michael Sheen, Anton Lesser, Bill Nighy
 1995: The Mind-Body Problem, BBC Radio 4 – with Bill Nighy, Michael Maloney, Geraldine James
 1993: A Romance, BBC Radio 4 – with Michael Maloney, Kristin Milward
 1992: High Flyer, BBC Radio 4 – with Mick Ford
 1992: A Sense of Things Moving Forward, BBC Radio 4/World Service – with Ben Kingsley, Frances Barber, Simon Russell Beale, Patrick Malahide
 1991: Figure with Meat, BBC Radio 3 – with Clive Merrison, Judy Parfitt, Lynsey Baxter
 1991: Piece, after Iain Banks, BBC Radio 5 – with Bill Paterson
 1990: Love to Madeleine, BBC Radio 4 – with Richard E. Grant, Miranda Richardson, Phil Davis
 1989: By Where the Old Shed Used to Be, BBC Radio 3 – with Miranda Richardson, Anton Lesser, Judy Parfitt
 1988: Great Men of Music, BBC Radio 4 – with Phil Davis

Translations
 1990: The Devil by Maupassant, BBC Radio 4 – with Ian Holm
 1989: The Baptism by Maupassant, BBC Radio 3 – with Anton Lesser

References

External links
 

1964 births
Alumni of King's College London
Alumni of the University of East Anglia
English television writers
American dramatists and playwrights
Living people